Nora Fernandes (born 18 June 1998) is an Indian professional footballer who plays as a goalkeeper for I-League club Churchill Brothers.

Career 
Fernandes began his professional career with Salgaocar. He played for them in the U-18 I-League and the Goa Professional League.

Churchill Brothers 
Fernandes moved to Churchill Brothers in 2020 and got his first game in the 2021–22 season of the I-League. He made his debut in a 2–1 defeat of Kenkre on 10 April 2022 at the Naihati Stadium.

Career statistics

References

External links 
 Nora Fernandes profile at AIFF

1998 births
Living people
Indian footballers
Footballers from Goa
Association football midfielders
I-League players
Goa Professional League players
Churchill Brothers FC Goa players